Influenza A virus subtype H2N2 (A/H2N2) is a subtype of Influenza A virus. H2N2 has mutated into various strains including the "Asian flu" strain (now extinct in the wild), H3N2, and various strains found in birds. It is also suspected of causing a human pandemic in 1889.
The geographic spreading of the 1889 Russian flu has been studied and published.

Russian flu

Some believe that the 1889–1890 Russian flu was caused by the influenzavirus A virus subtype H2N2, but the evidence is not conclusive. It is the earliest flu pandemic for which detailed records are available. More recently, there are speculations that it might have been caused by one of the coronaviruses first discovered in the 1960s.

Asian flu

The "Asian Flu" was a category 2 flu pandemic outbreak of influenzavirus A that originated in Singapore in early 1957 lasting until 1958. The first cases were reported in Singapore in February 1957. In February 1957, a new influenza A (H2N2) virus emerged in East Asia, triggering a pandemic (“Asian Flu”). This H2N2 virus was composed of three different genes from an H2N2 virus that originated from an avian influenza A virus, including the H2 hemagglutinin and the N2 neuraminidase genes. It was first reported in Singapore in February 1957, Hong Kong in April 1957, and in coastal cities in the United States in summer 1957.  Some authors believe it originated from mutation in wild ducks combining with a pre-existing human strain. Other authors are less certain. It reached Hong Kong by April, and US by June.  Estimates of US and worldwide deaths caused by this pandemic varies widely depending on source; ranging from  approximately 69,800 to 116,000 in the United States, and worldwide from 1 million to 4 million, with the World Health Organization (WHO) settling on "about 2 million,"  with an overall mortality rate of 0.6%. Asian Flu was of the H2N2 subtype (a notation that refers to the configuration of the hemagglutinin and neuraminidase proteins in the virus) of type A influenza, and an influenza vaccine was developed in 1957 to contain its outbreak.

The Asian Flu strain later evolved via antigenic shift into H3N2 which caused a milder pandemic from 1968 to 1969.

Both the H2N2 and H3N2 pandemic strains contained avian influenza virus RNA segments.

Test kits
From October 2004 to February 2005, approximately 3,700 test kits of the 1957 H2N2 virus were accidentally spread around the world from the College of American Pathologists (CAP). CAP assists laboratories in accuracy by providing unidentified samples of viruses; private contractor Meridian Bioscience in Cincinnati, U.S., chose the 1957 strain instead of one of the less deadly avian influenza virus subtypes. The 1957 H2N2 virus is considered deadly and the U.S. government called for the vials containing the strain to be destroyed.

References

Further reading
 Pandemic preparedness: lessons learnt from H2N2 and H9N2 candidate vaccines
 
 New Scientist: Bird Flu
 Pandemic-causing 'Asian flu' accidentally released
 Persistence of Q strain of H2N2 influenza virus in avian species: antigenic, biological and genetic analysis of avian and human H2N2 viruses

External links
 Influenza Research Database Database of influenza sequences and related information.

H2N2
1957 in Hong Kong
1889–1890 flu pandemic

de:Asiatische Grippe
es:Gripe asiática
it:Influenza asiatica
pt:Gripe asiática
sv:Asiaten
zh:亚洲流感